The San Joaquin River National Wildlife Refuge is a protected area of  along the San Joaquin River in the northern San Joaquin Valley, California.  It is within San Joaquin County and Stanislaus County.

Established in 1987 under the authority of the Endangered Species and Migratory Bird Conservation Acts, the refuge has also played a major role in the recovery of Aleutian cackling geese.

Riparian forest
Within the borders of the San Joaquin National Wildlife Refuge is one of California's largest riparian forest restoration projects. 400,000 native trees have been planted across  of the river's floodplain. The major project was led by River Partners, Inc., a non-profit organization committed to restoring riparian zone habitat for wildlife.

Riparian forests, which once covered large portions of California's Central Valley, have been greatly reduced due to state and federal water projects and diversions. The riparian habitat is host to many rare animals. Swainson's hawks nest in the canopy of tall cottonwood trees. Herons and cormorants form communal nesting colonies within the tops of the large oaks on Christman Island. Endangered riparian brush rabbits have been reintroduced to their historic habitat from captive-reared populations.

References

External links
Official San Joaquin River National Wildlife Refuge website
Refuge profile

National Wildlife Refuges in California
Parks in the San Joaquin Valley
Forests of California
San Joaquin River
Wetlands of California
Protected areas of San Joaquin County, California
Protected areas of Stanislaus County, California
Natural history of the Central Valley (California)
Natural history of San Joaquin County, California
Geography of San Joaquin County, California
Geography of Stanislaus County, California
Protected areas established in 1987
1987 establishments in California